Andrew Symmes Bryant (March 3, 1841 – October 6, 1931) was an American soldier who fought in the American Civil War. Bryant received the country's highest award for bravery during combat, the Medal of Honor, for his action  at New Bern, North Carolina,  on May 23, 1863. He was honored with the award on August 13, 1873.

Biography
Bryant was born on March 3, 1841, in Springfield, Massachusetts. He joined the Army from Springfield in August 1862, and mustered out with his regiment in July 1863.

Bryant died on October 6, 1931, and his remains are interred at the Springfield Cemetery.

Medal of Honor citation

See also

List of American Civil War Medal of Honor recipients: A–F

References

1841 births
1931 deaths
People of Massachusetts in the American Civil War
Union Army officers
United States Army Medal of Honor recipients
American Civil War recipients of the Medal of Honor